Kahina Chettout (born ) is an Algerian female volleyball player. She is part of the Algeria women's national volleyball team.

She participated in the 2014 FIVB Volleyball World Grand Prix.
On club level she played for NR CHLEF in 2014. Since 2015, she started playing for GS Pétroliers  (Groupement Sportif des Pétroliers) of Algiers. She is a setter.

References

External links
 Profile at FIVB.org

1992 births
Living people
Algerian women's volleyball players
Place of birth missing (living people)
Setters (volleyball)
21st-century Algerian people